Wild Seed – Wild Flower is the debut full-length album by American singer Dionne Farris. Having found success for her performance on the song "Tennessee" by the alternative hip hop group Arrested Development, Farris, rather than continue with Arrested Development, made a solo record with members of the band Follow for Now, David Ryan Harris and Billy Fields. The lead single, "I Know", peaked at number 4 on the Billboard Hot 100 in 1995.

Reception

"I Know" was the only hit from the album, but Tom Demalon of AllMusic wrote that the album's "charms run much deeper" than the "percolating and infectious" hit single. However, critic Brent Mann expressed the opposite view, stating that the other songs "lacked energy and direction" and in one case turned "plodding and ponderous."

Track listing

Personnel
Adapted from the liner notes of Wild Seed – Wild Flower.
Dionne Farris – vocals, vocal and string arrangements
Paul Barrere (slide), Bruce Gaitsch, Skitch Lovett, Tony Ruffin – guitars
David Ryan Harris – guitars, keyboards, drums, percussion, drum programming, backing vocals
Billy Fields, David Frank, Tim Heintz, David Kahne, Carl Young – keyboards
Steve Twyman – organ
Milton Davis, Randy Jackson, Lonnie Marshall – bass
Anthony Johnson, Ju Ju House – drums
John Mitchell – drums, percussion, drum programming
Pete Escovedo, Jeff Haynes – percussion
Joel Derouin – violin
Suzie Katayama – cello
Russell Mullen – trumpet
Leesa Richards, Terry Shelton – backing vocals

Charts

References

1994 debut albums
Dionne Farris albums
Columbia Records albums
Albums produced by Randy Jackson
Albums recorded at Westlake Recording Studios